Fultali is a village in Elahabad Union of Debidwar Upazila, Comilla District, Bangladesh. According to the census of 2011, the population of the village was 3,482.

Mosque 
Fultali Central jami mosque 
Fultali Hafizia madrasha
Fultali Poschim para jami mosque
Fultali Uttar para jami mosque
Fultali Syed bari mosque

Education 
There are many schools, but no colleges, in Fultali. 
Fultali High School
Fultali Government primary school
Fultali Talimul Islamic Kindar Garden
Fultali Model Academy

References 

F
Villages in Chittagong Division